Kanana is a small settlement in Maruleng Local Municipality under Mopani District Municipality in the Limpopo province of South Africa.

References

Populated places in the Maruleng Local Municipality